The 1973 Australian Formula 2 Championship was a CAMS sanctioned motor racing title open to Australian Formula 2 racing cars. It was the seventh Australian Formula 2 Championship to be awarded by CAMS.

The championship was dominated by multiple-championship winning driver Leo Geoghegan, who scored a perfect 54 points from six round wins over the course of the season.

Calendar
The championship was contested over a seven-round series with one race per round.

Points system
Championship points were awarded on a 9-6-4-3-2-1 basis to the first six eligible finishers at each round. Only holders of a General Competition License issued by CAMS were eligible for points and each driver could retain points only from his/her best six round results.

Results

Notes and references

External links
 Image of 1973 Australian Formula 2 Champion Leo Geoghegan (Biranna 273 Ford) at the Oran Park round of the championship

Australian Formula 2 Championship
Formula 2 Championship